Americana was a British radio programme broadcast on BBC Radio 4 from spring 2009 to autumn 2011.  It offered a "mix of discussion, interviews and features, with a focus on the voices of ordinary Americans" and was touted as the "successor to the late Alistair Cooke's Letter from America."

Americana was broadcast for the first time on 31 May 2009 with Matt Frei as presenter;  According to Frei, he expected listeners to Americana would hear "what America is talking, arguing, fretting, laughing and, yes, dreaming about. We hope to surprise, entertain and inform. And by letting America itself do most of the talking we promise never to be dull."  After Frei left the BBC in May 2011, Jonny Dymond took over as presenter.

In July 2011, BBC Radio 4 revealed that Radio 4 controller Gwyneth Williams, "interest[ed] in wider internationalism and less emphasis on the US", decided to cancel Americana, effective in autumn. The show's final episode was broadcast on 11 September 2011; the topic was the tenth anniversary of the September 11 attacks.

References

External links 

BBC Radio 4 programmes
British documentary radio programmes
Audio podcasts
2009 radio programme debuts
2009 establishments in the United Kingdom
2011 disestablishments in the United Kingdom
2011 podcast endings
2009 podcast debuts